Emma Roldán (February 3, 1893 – August 29, 1978) was a Mexican character actress and costume designer. She is remembered as the sharp-tongued, domineering matron of Mexican cinema, and was nominated three times for a Silver Ariel Award.

Acted in some of Fernando de Fuentes most important movies, like El prisionero trece and El compadre Mendoza, both from his Revolution Trilogy, and first Mexican box-office Allá en el Rancho Grande.

Early life
A San Luis Potosí native, Roldán was born Emma Roldán Reyna to hotel owners José María Roldán and Virginia Reyna, the second of four siblings. Her parents' hotel was located in front of the "Teatro de la Paz" in San Luis Potosí, where theatrical companies would perform. It is there where she met her husband Pedro Jesús Ojeda with whom she procreated two children, Emma Ojeda Roldán and Pedro Ojeda Roldán. She and her husband moved to Monterrey, but they would tour across the country, a life she disliked. They later divorced and Roldán relocated to her parents' home in Potosí.

Selected filmography
 El prisionero trece (1933) as Margarita Ramos
 El compadre Mendoza (1934) as the mute
 Allá en el Rancho Grande (1936) as Ángela
 Women of Today (1936)
 These Men (1937)
 Jesusita in Chihuahua (1942) as Tula Tulares de Tulancingo
 Romeo and Juliet (1943)
 The Escape (1944)
 The Hour of Truth (1945)
 The Museum of Crime (1945) as Enfermera
 Dizziness (1946) as Nana Joaquina
 La reina del trópico (1946)
 The Flesh Commands (1948)
 Jalisco Fair (1948)
 Rough But Respectable (1949)
 The Masked Tiger (1951)
 Los hijos de María Morales (1951) as María Morales
 A Tailored Gentleman (1954) as Doña Pelos, portera
 The Soldiers of Pancho Villa (1959) as Comadrona
 Beyond All Limits (1959) as Carmela
 Black Skull (1960)
 Chucho el Roto (1960)
 Dangers of Youth (1960)
 Invincible Guns (1960)
 Immediate Delivery (1963)
 El rey del tomate (1963) as Tía Mila
 El miedo no anda en burro (1976) as Doña Paz
 El lugar sin límites (1978) as Ludovinia

Awards and nominations

References

External links

1893 births
1978 deaths
Mexican film actresses
Mexican television actresses
20th-century Mexican actresses
Golden Age of Mexican cinema
Actresses from San Luis Potosí